The Challenger Deep (CD) is the deepest known point in the Earth's seabed hydrosphere, a slot-shaped valley in the floor of Mariana Trench, with depths exceeding 10,900 meters. It is located in the Federated States of Micronesia. In 2019, sonar mapping of Challenger Deep by the DSSV Pressure Drop, which employed a Kongsberg SIMRAD EM124 multi beam echosounder system, showed three 'pools' – Western, Central and Eastern – that comprised the bottom of Challenger Deep.

In 1960, Don Walsh and Jacques Piccard were the first two humans to reach Challenger Deep, completing that dive as a team. 52 years later, James Cameron became the first person to solo dive that point. Piccard, Walsh and Cameron remained the only people to reach the world's deepest seafloor until 2019, when regular dives in DSV Limiting Factor began.

By November 2022, a total of twenty-two dives had reached Challenger Deep, of which nineteen had been in Limiting Factor. Astronaut Kathryn D. Sullivan and mountaineer Vanessa O'Brien were the first two women to visit Challenger Deep in 2020. Victor Vescovo has made the most dives to Challenger Deep; by August 2022 he had made eleven dives to the Eastern pool, two to the Western pool, and two to the Central pool for a total of 15 dives.

The following is a list of individuals who have descended to Challenger Deep in the Federated States of Micronesia. These individuals will have descended at least  into one of the three pools (western, central or eastern) that constitute Challenger Deep.

References

Extreme points of Earth
Underwater diving explorers